Alenka is a popular Slovene female given name. It ranks among the top 30 most common female names in Slovenia. Another version of the same name is Lenka. In Slavic languages, both versions are often treated as diminutive names of Alena and Lena, respectively. 

The name may refer to:

Alenka Bernot, Yugoslav/Slovenian slalom canoeist who competed in the early 1960s
Alenka Bikar (born 1974), Slovenian former sprinter who specializes in the 200 metres
Alenka Bratušek (born 1970), Slovenian Prime Minister
Alenka Čebašek (born 1989), Slovenian cross-country skier
Alenka Cuderman (born 1961), former Yugoslav/Slovenian handball player who competed in the 1984 Summer Olympics
Alenka Dovžan (born 1976), retired Slovenian alpine skier
Alenka Godec (born 1964), Slovenian jazz and pop singers
Alenka Gotar (born 1977), Slovene soprano singer
Alenka Kejžar (born 1979), Olympic class swimmer
Alenka Puhar (born 1945), Slovenian journalist, author, translator, and historian
Alenka Sottler (born 1958), Slovene painter and illustrator
Alenka Zupančič (born 1966), Slovenian philosopher whose work focuses on psychoanalysis and continental philosophy

es:Alenka